Sir Martin Evans (born 1941) is a British biologist and Nobel prize winner.

Martin or Martyn Evans may also refer to:

 Martin Evans (cricketer) (1904–1998), English cricketer
 Martin Evans (model engineer) (1916–2003)
 Martyn Evans (born 1953), Australian politician
 Martyn Evans (academic) (H. Martyn Evans), professor of philosophy of music at the University of Durham
 Martyn Evans, English heavy metal guitarist in Trigger the Bloodshed

See also
 Marty Evans (Marsha J. Evans, born 1947), retired U.S. Navy admiral
Sir Martyn Evans-Bevan, 2nd Baronet, of the Evans-Bevan baronets